Serenella Andrade (born 18 September 1962 in Naples, Italy) is a Portuguese journalist and television presenter.

She is the daughter of the director and former opera singer Luís Andrade, Andrade presented the Jogos sem Fronteiras for several years, along with Eládio Clímaco.

She presented the competition "SMS" and the program A Hora da Sorte (The Hour of Luck) on the RTP that includes the extraction of lottery numbers from Santa Casa de Misericórdia lottery.

Andrade lives in Lisbon, is married and has three children.

Filmography 
 1991 - Jogo de Cartas
 1995 - 1997 - Casa Cheia
 1997 - Casa de Artistas
 1998 - Obrigado Por Tudo
 1998 - 1999 - Santa Casa
 2001 - Fim de Ano 2001
 2001 - Made in Portugal
 2003 - SMS - Ser Mais Sabedor
 2003 - Domingo é Domingo
 2005 - Falas do Coração
 2006 - 2014 - A Hora da Sorte
 2007 - Portugal Azul
 2007 - 2014 - Verão Total
 2014/2015 - Casamentos de Santo António (reporter)
 2014 - Fatura da Sorte
 2014/2015 - Agora Nós (reporter)
 2014/2015 - 5 km EDP - Corrida da Mulher

References

1962 births
Living people
People from Lisbon
Portuguese people of Italian descent
Portuguese television presenters
Portuguese women journalists
Portuguese women television presenters